Steve Waldrip is an American attorney, businessman, and politician serving as a member of the Utah House of Representatives from the 8th district. Elected in 2018, he assumed office in 2019.

Early life and education 
Waldrip was born and raised in Orange County, California. His father was an attorney and judge and his mother was a homemaker. Waldrip earned a Bachelor of Arts degree in English from Brigham Young University, a Juris Doctor from the S.J. Quinney College of Law at the University of Utah, and a Master of Laws in taxation law from the University of Washington School of Law.

Career 
Since graduating from law school, Waldrip has worked as an attorney and real estate consultant and developer. In addition to operating a private real estate firm, Waldrip is a partner of the Rocky Mountain Homes Fund. Waldrip was elected to the Utah House of Representatives in 2018, defeating Jason Kyle in the Republican primary and Deana Froerer in the November general election.

References 

Living people
People from Orange County, California
Brigham Young University alumni
S.J. Quinney College of Law alumni
University of Washington School of Law alumni
Republican Party members of the Utah House of Representatives
Businesspeople from Utah
Utah lawyers
Year of birth missing (living people)
21st-century American politicians